Richard Beecroft Allan, Baron Allan of Hallam (born 11 February 1966) is a British politician and life peer. He was the Liberal Democrat Member of Parliament for Sheffield Hallam from the general election of Thursday 1 May 1997 until the dissolution of Parliament on 11 April 2005.

He was made a life peer in the 2010 Dissolution Honours.

Early life
Allan was born in Sheffield. He went to the independent Oundle School in north-east Northamptonshire. He studied at Pembroke College, Cambridge, and gained a BA in Archaeology and Anthropology in 1988. From Bristol Polytechnic, he gained an MSc in Information Technology in 1990. He was a field archaeologist in Britain, France and the Netherlands in 1984–85, and in Ecuador in 1988–89. He was a computer manager at Avon FHSA in 1991–97.

Parliamentary career
In 1997, Allan unseated Irvine Patnick of the Conservative Party achieving a majority of 8,221 with a swing of 15.3%. He was only the second non-Conservative to win Sheffield Hallam, and the first since 1918. In 2001, he was re-elected with an increased majority of 9,347. During his tenure, Allan held various committee seats, including the Chair of the House of Commons Information Select Committee and a seat on the House of Commons Liaison Select Committee. Richard Allan was the founding chairman of the Parthenon 2004 campaign for the return of the Parthenon Marbles.

Allan did not seek reelection at the 2005 general election. He was succeeded by future Lib Dem leader and Deputy Prime Minister Nick Clegg, for whom he acted as campaign manager.

On 22 July 2010, he was created a life peer as Baron Allan of Hallam, of Ecclesall in the county of South Yorkshire, and was introduced in the House of Lords on 26 July 2010, where he sits as a Liberal Democrat peer.

Post political career
From June 2009 to September 2019 Allan was employed by Facebook as Director of Policy in Europe, responsible for representing the company and lobbying EU governments on matters of concern to it.  He was previously Head of Government Affairs for Cisco Systems UK. Allan has given various interviews responding to media concerns about Facebook, and in January 2012 he gave evidence to the Leveson Inquiry on Facebook's attitude to malicious posting and to privacy.

He is a visiting fellow of the Oxford Internet Institute and deputy chairman of the British Committee for the Reunification of the Parthenon Marbles.

Personal life
Allan married Louise Netley on 25 May 1991 in Bath, Somerset. They have since separated. Allan has three daughters. Rosie Mae Allan, born Sept 30th 1988 and twin daughters with his current partner.

References

External links

 
 More Political Times Richard Allan's weblog (archived)

 Oxford Internet Institute
 Sheffield Liberal Democrats (Archived)

1966 births
Alumni of Pembroke College, Cambridge
Alumni of the University of the West of England, Bristol
English bloggers
Facebook employees
Liberal Democrats (UK) councillors
Liberal Democrats (UK) life peers
Life peers created by Elizabeth II
Liberal Democrats (UK) MPs for English constituencies
Living people
People educated at Birkdale School
People educated at Oundle School
Politics of Sheffield
UK MPs 1997–2001
UK MPs 2001–2005
British male bloggers